USS Flasher has been the name of more than one United States Navy ship, and may refer to:

, a submarine in commission from 1943 to 1946
, a submarine in commission from 1966 to 1992

United States Navy ship names